is a Japanese four-panel slice-of-life comedy manga series written and illustrated by Hiroyuki. It was originally serialized in Weekly Shōnen Magazine on November 28, 2012. and then moved to Bessatsu Shonen Magazine where it was serialized between July 2015 and December 2017. Twelve compilation volumes by Kodansha have been released. An anime television series adaptation by Diomedéa aired between July and September 2017.

Plot
The story follows the everyday life of high school girl Yoshiko Hanabatake. True to the title, she is known to be exceptionally stupid academically as well as socially. She constantly hangs out with and annoys her studious and serious neighbor/childhood friend Akuru Akutsu, whom Yoshiko's mother wants her to marry. Yoshiko becomes friends with the level-headed Sayaka Sumino, who, along with Akuru, try to keep Yoshiko in check. The Public Morals Chairwoman dislikes the free-spirited Yoshiko but when Akuru makes some casual remarks that compliment her, the chairwoman falls in love with Akuru and begins stalking him while repressing her perverted thoughts. Yoshiko also befriends Ryuichi Kurosaki, a delinquent who thinks of Yoshiko as a gang leader, a group of playground kids, a group of gyaru, and some other students and staff at school.

Characters

Major characters

 

 The title character of the story is a mischievous, cheerful high school girl who is stupid both academically and socially. She even gets zeroes on multiple choice tests. However what she lacks intellectual capacity she makes up with spunk, ridiculous audacity and abundant energy when it comes to what she wants. She has light brown hair styled in long twin tails. She frequently hangs out with her neighbor, childhood best friend and classmate Akuru much to his annoyance. Her favorite food is bananas. She fails to realize when people are annoyed at her, often mistaking it as a person's desire to play or become her friend.
 

 Akuru is a smart, reclusive and serious high school student who is constantly annoyed by Yoshiko's antics. The reason he and Yoshiko are classmates is because he chose to attend a local high school as the really academic schools were too far away for him to study properly. He scolds Yoshiko for her idiotic behavior, even resorting to punches. He prefers to study, and does not have a girlfriend or any friends besides Yoshiko, although Sayaka agrees to be his friend out of pity, even though he has no desire to obtain more friends. A recurring gag is that he is never able to get a perfect score on any exam, always falling a few marks short.
 

 Akuru and Yoshiko's classmate who ends up becoming friends with the two. She has blond hair that goes over her shoulders and wears her school uniform with white knee socks. She too is level-headed and assumes the straight-man role, often moderating interactions between Yoshiko and others. She is kind and worries about being boring. She is very sensitive, especially when others point out her small chest, which appears slightly small, even after she pads it. She sometimes loses her patience.
 

 A high school upperclassman who is in charge of morals at the school. She has long dark hair. She cannot stand Yoshiko's idiocy. When Akuru starts complimenting her by accident, saying unintentionally princely things like "If (Yoshiko) gives you any more trouble let me know." and "She's a hundred times more attractive than (Yoshiko)", she develops a major crush on Akuru. She starts stalking him, and often has lewd fantasies about him. Yoshiko considers her a love rival because of her breast size. In many instances she tries to reach out to Akuru but her interactions give her a reputation of being just as weird, even though she is initially unaware of that, but with Sayaka's help she eventually discovers her true nature and tries to mend her ways but with little result. She is fairly smart academically, placing in the top 5 of her class, but later requests to repeat a grade so that she can be in the same school year as Akuru.

Supporting characters
 

 Yoshiko's mother who is constantly worrying about her daughter, but brightens up to the fact that Akuru pays attention to her and secretly hopes he and Yoshiko can marry, keeping it a secret out of fear of how Akuru would react. She hatches several schemes to have Yoshiko flirt with Akuru but they often backfire. At first she perceives Sayaka to be a threat to marry Akuru but after checking her panties are that of a child, she deems her safe, but finds the Chairwoman to be a far more serious threat. She is shown to be somewhat psychotic, given her drastic methods and the obscene nature of her schemes.   
 

 A delinquent guy whom Yoshiko interacts with, he becomes Yoshiko's disciple, calling her . He tries to become friends with Akuru but fails because of his shyness, and ends up acting more like his underling. While he may seem stupid, Ryuuichi has proven himself to be very smart as he once stayed home and studied even placing higher than Akuru who was shocked that Ryuuichi was skilled in academics.
 

 Akuru's little sister who is in the fifth grade. She is worried she will become an idiot like Yoshiko as she struggles academically, and that even her brother tells her to give up - even giving her a guidebook on how to get through life without a degree as a birthday present. She admires Sayaka because she helps tutor her a little bit.
 Playground kids
 

Two boys (Mamoru and Tadashi) and a girl whom Yoshiko meets at the playground. They are concerned about Yoshiko's desires to just play all day and not study. Nozomi is kind to others and especially gullible to Yoshiko and her teachings.
 

 Yoshiko's homeroom teacher. She tries to teach Yoshiko but with not much luck. She becomes painfully aware of her singleness because of Yoshiko. She loves Yoshio (Yoshiko in disguise).
 

 A big dog that Yoshiko takes a liking to and would like to ride like a horse. Akuru likes him too as he seems to understand his feelings.
 
 A second-year student who takes a liking to Yoshiko and treats her like a dog, even with commands like sit and stay. Her facial expression is difficult to read.
 

 The leader of a trio of gyaru classmates whom Yoshiko starts interacting with later in the series. They do not really like her, but they are just as dumb as Yoshiko in school. Akane has red hair and is the most antagonistic of the three against Yoshiko.. However, she tends to listen and participate in Yoshiko's schemes, and is sometimes unwillingly manipulated by her. She dislikes Akuru, who calls her ugly. She also wants to be more popular and have a boyfriend. 
  .

 The second of the gyaru trio classmates. She has short blond hair and usually has an indifferent facial expression to people and romance. 
 

 The third of the gyaru classmates. She has long dark hair. She is only one of the three who has a boyfriend (Toshi), although she is extremely shy about it.

Media

Manga
The manga was serialized in Kodansha's Weekly Shōnen Magazine starting on November 28, 2012. A crossover one-shot with Love Hina was released on August 27, 2014. Starting with the July 2015 issue, Aho-Girl was moved to Bessatsu Shōnen Magazine. The manga ended serialization in December 2017.

Kodansha Comics has licensed the manga series in English. The English manga cover presents the title as a dictionary definition.

Anime
An anime adaptation produced by Diomedéa aired under the title Aho-Girl: Clueless Girl from July 4, 2017 to September 19, 2017. Keizou Kusakawa served as the chief director, with Shingo Tamaki also as a director, and Takashi Aoshima as the script writer. The episodes are 15 minutes long. The show was broadcast on Tokyo MX, Sun TV, and BS11. Crunchyroll simulcasted the series in multiple regions.

It was released as a single on July 5, 2017.

Reception
Volume 1 reached the 43rd place on the weekly Oricon manga chart and, as of May 18, 2013, has sold 27,861 copies; volume 2 reached the 22nd place and, as of October 27, 2013, has sold 61,653 copies; volume 3 reached the 20th place and, as of April 27, 2014, has sold 62,692 copies; volume 4 reached the 22nd place and, as of August 24, 2014, has sold 55,158 copies; volume 5 reached the 34th place and, as of January 18, 2015, has sold 27,473 copies. Volume 6 placed 24th and sold 52,198 copies over 2 weeks. Volume 7 reached number 24 with 30,236 copies sold in its first week.

Notes

  "Ch." is shortened form for chapter and refers to a chapter number of the collected Aho-Girl manga
  "Ep." is shortened form for episode and refers to an episode number of the Aho-Girl anime

References

External links
 Aho Girl on Weekly Shōnen Magazine 
 Aho Girl manga on Kodansha USA
  
 

2017 anime television series debuts
Anime series based on manga
Comedy anime and manga
Crunchyroll anime
Diomedéa
Kodansha manga
Manga adapted into television series
Shōnen manga
Slice of life anime and manga
Yonkoma
Tokyo MX original programming